Monster Mash (Italian: Chi ha paura?) is a 2000 Italian-American direct-to-video animated musical comedy horror film co-produced by DIC Entertainment, L.P. and Rai Fiction. It is an original story, based on the lore of Frankenstein, the Wolfman, and Count Dracula.

Plot

Drac, Frank and Wolf were the scariest monsters around, until they became associated with fun and other things happening like Drac no longer having his fangs and Wolf going bald. They end up summoned by the Superior Court of Horrors, where the judge orders them to prove that they are still scary by the end of 24 hours or they will be sentenced to an eternity entertaining at children's parties. Drac, Frank, and Wolf are assigned to scare the Tinklemeister family.

The Tinklemeisters soon end up assisting Drac, Frank, and Wolf into proving that they are still scary, even when the Grim Reaper Prosecutor sends three new monsters-Freddie de Spaghetti: King of Carbohydrates (a humanoid spaghetti monster based on Freddy Krueger and Jason Voorhees), Chicky the Doll of Destruction (a wind-up toy based on Chucky) and the Alien Eater-to make sure that they all fail in their mission.

Cast
 David Sobolov as Frank
 Scott McNeil as Wolf
 French Tickner as Drac 
 Janyse Jaud as Spike Tinklemeister, Mom Tinklemeister
 Tabitha St. Germain as Chicky
 Phil Trainer as Yorick
 Jim Byrnes as Grim Reaper Prosecutor
 Patricia Drake as Stella Tinklemeister
 Phil Hayes as Judge
 Robert O. Smith
 Ian James Corlett
 Dave "Squatch" Ward as Freddie de Spaghetti

Songs
 "Monster Mash" (Robert Pickett)
 "Waiting for Spike to Speak" (Matt McGuire) – Mom, Dad and Stella
 "The Heebe Jeebe" (McGuire, Karen Guthery)
 "When We Were Bad" (Sandy Howell, Geoff Levin) – Frank, Drac and Wolf
 "Monster Mash"
 Funk Groove arrangement by David Pavlovitch
 Country arrangement by Matt McGuire
 Alternative Angst arrangement by Jason Michas

Release
Monster Mash was released on VHS on August 29, 2000 in the United States by Universal Studios Home Video.

It received an Italian DVD release in 2003 from Alfadedis Entertainment. In the United States, the feature was bundled alongside Alvin and the Chipmunks Meet Frankenstein, Alvin and the Chipmunks Meet the Wolfman and four episodes of Archie's Weird Mysteries as part of the Monster Bash Fun Pack DVD on September 7, 2004.

A standalone DVD was released by NCircle Entertainment in 2007, although it removes a metafictional moment towards the end of the film, as well as the "Monster Mash" music video, due to copyright issues with Universal.

References

External links
 
 

2000 films
2000 animated films
2000s American animated films
2000 comedy horror films
2000s musical comedy films
2000s parody films
American children's animated comedy films
Children's horror films
American children's animated musical films
American comedy horror films
American musical comedy films
American parody films
American vampire films
Films based on songs
Italian children's films
Italian comedy films
Italian animated films
Italian animated horror films
Italian musical films
Italian vampire films
DIC Entertainment films
Dracula films
Frankenstein films
2000s monster movies
Universal Pictures direct-to-video animated films
Werewolves in animated film
2000s children's films
Parodies of horror
2000s English-language films
2000s French films